The 62nd Air Defense Artillery Regiment is an Air Defense Artillery regiment in the United States Army. The lineages of some of the units that have been part of the 62nd Air Defense Artillery and its predecessors give the regiment campaign credit for the War of 1812.

History

Lineage
Constituted 27 April 1798 as the 62nd Artillery (CAC). Activated at Fort Winfield Scott 7 January 1918. Assigned to 33rd Brigade CAC, and shipped to Camp Mills New York arrived in France 21 July 1918; returned from France 19 February 1919, Demobilized at Camp Eustis March 1919.
 Reconstituted 1 August 1921 as the 2nd Antiaircraft Battalion (CAC) and organized 4 September 1921 at Fort Totten (New York), with HHD&CT, Search Light, Gun, and Machine Gun Batteries.
Redesignated 1 June 1922 as 62nd Antiaircraft Battalion, (CAC), and firing batteries consolidated with inactive serially numbered companies as follows
 Searchlight Battery as Battery A. consolidated with 82nd Company (CAC)
 Gun Battery was combined with 165th Company to become Battery B.
 Machine gun Battery as Battery C. consolidated with 167th Company
 HHD&CT redesignated 258th Company (CAC).
Battalion expanded to a regiment 27 August 1922 with HHB, Service Battery, HH&CT 1st Battalion, and nine lettered firing batteries as follows.
 Headquarters and Headquarters Battery, from 9th Company (CAC)
 Service Battery from 37th Company (CAC)
 Headquarters and Headquarters Detachment & Combat Train 1st Battalion, from HHD 1st Battalion 62nd AA.
 A. Battery from 82nd Company (CAC)
 B. Battery from 17th Company (CAC)
 C. Battery from 29th Company (CAC)
 D. Battery from 33rd Company (CAC) (Inactive)
 E. Battery from 30th Company (CAC)
 F. Battery from 32nd Company (CAC)
 G. Battery from 165th Company (CAC) (Inactive)
 H. Battery from 167th Company (CAC) (Inactive)
Regiment Redesignated from 62nd Artillery (AA)(CAC) to 62nd Coast Artillery (AA) Regiment on 1 July 1924. and reorganized.
 on 1 July 1939 Batteries D, G, and H activated.
 20 January 1941 personnel from Battery B, and Search Light Platoon Battery A. reassigned to Newfoundland and redesignated Battery A 421st CA (AA) Battalion 1 August 1942
 16 June 1941 Battery H, with Searchlight Platoon A battery attached, transferred to Tungdliarfik Fjord, and Bluie West, Greenland.
 I. Battery (SL) Constituted from Battery H. 16 June 1941 and assigned as part of the garrison at Bluie West.
 H. Battery (37mm AW) transferred less personnel and equipment back to Fort Totten 26 July 1941.
 I. Battery inactivated and disbanded 12 December 1942, personnel and equipment transferred to Battery A 424th CA (AW) Battalion. Battery I transferred to Fort Totten less personnel and equipment.
 3rd Battalion constituted 27 May 1942 and activated at Fort Totten 15 June 1942.
Regiment moved to Camp Kilmer, NJ. and staged for overseas shipment. sailed for United Kingdom on 6 August 1942 on S.S. Monterey. Disembarked at Greenock, Scotland.
 Landed at Oran, Algeria, (Operation Torch), 11 November 1942. moved to Tunisia 10 June 1943.
 Landed Licata, Sicily 23 July 1943
 Inactivated at Palermo, Sicily 10 November 1943. broken up as follows-
 HHB redesignated 80th AAA Group.
 1st Battalion redesignated 62nd AAA (Gun) Battalion.
 2nd Battalion redesignated 893rd AAA (AW) Battalion.
 3rd Battalion redesignated 331st AAA (SL) Battalion.
62nd Coast Artillery (AA) disbanded 4 December 1943.
62nd AAA Battalion moved to Italy 7 July 1944 and landed in southern France 16 August 1944. inactivated 13 March 1946 at Camp Kilmer
 Redesignated 9 December 1948 as 62nd Antiaircraft Artillery Automatic Weapons Battalion, and reactivated 15 January 1949 at Fort Bliss.
 assigned to 2nd Armored Division 4 November 1949
 Relieved from 2nd Armor 20 October 1950.
 redesignated as the 62nd Antiaircraft Artillery Battalion 1 October 1953
 Inactivated 15 September 1958 in Germany
 Consolidated 24 June 1964 with 62nd Artillery a Parent Regiment under the Combat Arms Regimental System.

Current units 
 1st Battalion 62nd Air Defense Artillery Regiment 
 2nd Battalion 62nd Air Defense Artillery Regiment
 3rd Battalion 62nd Air Defense Artillery Regiment Deactivated 2004 
 B Battery (THAAD)
 E Battery (THAAD)

Distinctive unit insignia
 Description
A Silver color metal and enamel device 1 1/32 inches (2.78 cm) in height overall consisting of a shield blazoned:  Gyronny of six embattled Azure and Gules, a circle of sixteen mullets Argent.
 Symbolism
Units of the 62d Coast Artillery Regiment, from which the 62d Antiaircraft Artillery Battalion descended, participated in six wars- The War of 1812, Indian Wars, Mexican War, Civil War, Spanish–American War, and the Philippine Insurrection.  This participation is symbolized by the six embattled sectors.  At the time the first unit was organized the uniforms worn by the Artillery were dark blue faced with scarlet, and there were sixteen states in the Union, commemorated by the blue and red of the shield and the sixteen mullets, respectively.
 Background
The distinctive unit insignia was originally approved for the 62d Coast Artillery Regiment on 21 February 1929.  It was redesignated for the 62d Antiaircraft Artillery Automatic Weapons Battalion on 23 August 1949.  It was redesignated for the 62d Antiaircraft Artillery Battalion on 4 January 1956.  The insignia was redesignated for the 62d Artillery Regiment on 19 December 1958.  It was redesignated for the 62d Air Defense Artillery Regiment effective 1 September 1971.

Coat of arms

Blazon
 Shield
Gyronny of six embattled Azure and Gules, a circle of sixteen mullets Argent.
 Crest
On a wreath of the colors Argent and Azure, on a saltire Azure fimbriated Argent two arrows of the last, all entwined with a serpent Vert.   Motto:   NITIMUR IN ALTA (We Aim at High Things).

Symbolism
 Shield
Units of the 62d Coast Artillery Regiment, from which the 62d Antiaircraft Artillery Battalion descended, participated in six wars- The War of 1812, Indian Wars, Mexican War, Civil War, Spanish–American War, and the Philippine Insurrection.  This participation is symbolized by the six embattled sectors.  At the time the first unit was organized the uniforms worn by the Artillery were dark blue faced with scarlet, and there were sixteen states in the Union, commemorated by the blue and red of the shield and the sixteen mullets, respectively.
 Crest
The saltire is from the Confederate flag and is blue to indicate that the service during the Civil War was with the Northern Army.  The two arrows represent the Indian Wars and the serpent the Mexican War.

Background
The coat of arms was originally approved for the 62d Coast Artillery Regiment on 21 February 1929. It was redesignated for the 62d Antiaircraft Artillery Automatic Weapons Battalion on 23 August 1949.  It was redesignated for the 62d Antiaircraft Artillery Battalion on 4 January 1956.  The insignia was redesignated for the 62d Artillery Regiment on 19 December 1958.  It was redesignated for the 62d Air Defense Artillery Regiment effective 1 September 1971.

Campaign streamers
War of 1812
Streamer without inscription
Mexican War
 Monterey
 Vera Cruz
 Contreras
 Cerro Gordo
 Molino Del Ray
 Chapultepec
 Puebla 1947
Indian Wars
 Seminoles
 Washington 1856
 Washington 1858
Civil War
 Bull Run
 Mississippi River
 Peninsula
 Antietam
 Fredericksburg
 Chancellorsville
 Gettysburg
 Wilderness
 Spotsylvania
 Shenandoah
 Maryland 1862
 Maryland 1863
 Tennessee 1863
 Virginia 1863
 Tennessee 1864
War with Spain
 Manila
Philippine Insurrection
 Manila
 Malolos
 Luzon 1899
World War II
 Algeria-French Morocco
 Tunisia
 Sicily
 Rome- Arno
 Southern France
 Rhineland
 Ardennes-Alsace
 Central Europe

Decorations
Presidential Unit Citation (Navy)
Meritorious Unit Citation (Army)
Presidential Unit Citation (Korea)

References
 
 

 
 
  lineage
 Coast Artillery Journal August 1923  page 139
 Coast Artillery journal May 1931 
 Coast artillery Journal May 1930

External links
 http://www.history.army.mil/html/forcestruc/lh.html
 http://freepages.military.rootsweb.ancestry.com/~cacunithistories/62nd_Arty.html
 
 

062
062
Military units and formations established in 1917